Patricia Priest is a New Zealand public health scientist and epidemiologist who is Professor of Public Health in Medicine at the University of Otago. Throughout the COVID-19 pandemic, Priest served as an advisor to the New Zealand Ministry of Health. She was awarded an Ig Nobel Prize in 2010.

Early life and education 
Priest was a doctoral researcher at the University of Oxford. She investigated the relationship between prescribing antibiotics and antibiotic resistance in the community.

Research and career 
Priest's research considers epidemiology and public health. In 2010, Priest and two colleagues were jointly awarded an Ig Nobel Prize, which is awarded by Annals of Improbable Research for bizarre scientific discoveries. They were recognised for their work that identified walking with socks over shoes resulted in a frosty floor feeling less slippery than people walking without socks.

Priest studied the relationship between gardening and contracting Legionnaires' disease. She identified that Legionella longbeachae, which is present in compost and potting soil, could contribute to infection with Legionnaires' disease.

During the COVID-19 pandemic, Priest was appointed to the New Zealand Ministry of Health Technical Advisory Group, where she oversaw activity on epidemiology. She was responsible for advising the Ministry on surveillance and monitoring for COVID-19. Early in 2020, Priest recommended that people wear masks to limit transmission of the virus. She was worried that students would be responsible for spreading COVID-19.

Selected publications

References 

Living people
Alumni of the University of Oxford
Academic staff of the University of Otago
Year of birth missing (living people)
New Zealand epidemiologists
New Zealand public health doctors
Women epidemiologists
21st-century New Zealand scientists
Women public health doctors